Rouhollah Seifollahi is an Iranian football attacking midfielder who plays for Saipa in Persian Gulf Pro League.

Club career

Persepolis
He was promoted from Persepolis Academy to the first team by Ali Daei in 2011, and also was a member of Persepolis B and Persepolis U21. He only made six appearances for the club before leaving.

Damash
In summer 2013, he moved to Damash. In his only season with Damash, Seifollahi became one of the club's most important players, earned twenty-five league appearances and also scored five times.

Esteghlal Khuzestan
After Damash's relegation to the Azadegan League in 2014, Seifollahi signed a four-year contract with Esteghlal Khuzestan for fee around R3 Billion (about $100,000). He scored his first goal for the club in his debut on 1 August 2014 in a match against Gostaresh.

Club career statistics

Honours 
Esteghlal Khuzestan
Iran Pro League (1): 2015–16
Persepolis 
Hazfi Cup (1): 2010-11

References

External links

1990 births
Living people
Persepolis F.C. players
Damash Gilan players
Esteghlal Khuzestan players
Pars Jonoubi Jam players
Iranian footballers
Sportspeople from Tehran
Association football forwards